The Carmarthen transmitting station (Welsh: Gorsaf drosglwyddo Caerfyrddin) was originally built by the BBC in 1964/65 as a relay for VHF radio and television. The site was built on a 135 m ridge to the north of Carmarthen itself, and entered service on 15 March 1965. The transmission station is now owned and operated by Arqiva.

UHF 625-line colour television was never radiated from this site: the main transmitter at Carmel (20 km to the east) provided that service to the town from 1973 when it opened.

The 405-line VHF television service closed across the UK in 1985, but according to the BBC's transmitter list and the BBC's internal "Eng. Inf." magazine, Carmarthen was due to close early - in the first quarter of 1982. From that point onwards the site just relayed FM radio until 6 June 2011 when a single multiplex of DAB radio was added.

Channels listed by frequency

Analogue television

15 March 1965 - First Quarter 1982
The site provided BBC 405-line VHF television to the towns of Carmarthen and Abergwili which, being sited in a river estuary, could not reliably receive a signal from Wenvoe, 85 km to the east.

Analogue radio (VHF FM)

15 March 1965 - January 1973
According to the BBC's R&D report, the original frequencies for the FM radio services were as shown below.

January 1973 - May 1978
The three original radio services were still on their original frequencies as late as January 1973, but ERPs had been slightly increased to 10 W per channel by then. By May 1978 all three transmission frequencies had been moved by 400 kHz  and all three were transmitting in stereo by that time.

† Radio 4 was replaced by BBC Radio Cymru when it launched in January 1977.

May 1978 - Late 1980s
The new frequency plan continued unchanged until Radio 1 gained its own frequency.

Late 1980s - present
Radio 1 was given its own frequency as more of Band II became available for broadcasting after the bandplan changes of 1988.

Digital radio (DAB)

6 June 2011 - present

References

External links
 MB21's page on BBC 405 TV to Wales and the West
 405 Alive's list of transmitters"
 More details on 405-line BBC transmitters
 The Transmission Gallery: Carmarthen 
 UKFree's listing for the current radio services 

Transmitter sites in Wales
Wenvoe VHF 405-line Transmitter Group